Balgish is a Maldivian romantic web series written by Aminath Rinaza and directed by Ahmed Nimal. It stars Mariyam Shifa, Ali Azim, Nimal, Arifa Ali and Amira Ismail in main roles. The pilot episode of the series was released on 7 July 2022. The fives episodes' series narrates the life of an unfortunate child and the misfortunes which surrounds her.

Cast and characters

Main
 Mariyam Shifa as Haaya
 Ali Azim as Arham
 Ahmed Nimal as Farooq Hassan
 Arifa Ali as Ameena
 Amira Ismail as Fathun

Recurring
 Abdulla Mahir as Shan
 Maasha
 Aishath Mahmoodh as Shakeela
 Nahula

Guest
 Abdulla Naseer as the Judge (Episode 5)

Episodes

Development
The project was announced on 14 March 2022 as a five-episode romantic television drama series planned for telecast during Ramadan 1443 on Channel 13. Filming for the series took place in R. Dhuvaafaru and R. Maakurathu. Filming was completed in March 2022.

Soundtrack

Release and reception
The first episode of the series was made available for streaming through digital streaming platform Medianet Multi Screen on 7 July 2022. The series received mixed to positive reviews from critics, where Amira Ismail's performance as an evil step-mother was particularly praised.

References

Serial drama television series
Maldivian television shows
Maldivian web series